Somedays the Song Writes You is the thirteenth studio album by American singer-songwriter Guy Clark. It was released on September 22, 2009, under Dualtone Records, and was nominated for Best Contemporary Folk Album at the 53rd Annual Grammy Awards.

Track list

Personnel
Gina R. Binkley – design
Shawn Camp – acoustic guitar, acoustic slide guitar, fiddle, mandolin, slide guitar, vocal harmony
Guy Clark – acoustic guitar, producer, vocals
Bryn Davies – upright bass, cello, vocal harmony
Chris Latham – engineer, mastering, mixing, producer
Kenny Malone – drums, percussion, vocals
Verlon Thompson – acoustic guitar, harmonica, nylon string guitar, producer, vocal harmony

Chart performance

References 

2009 albums
Dualtone Records albums
Guy Clark albums